The Tepanecs or Tepaneca are a Mesoamerican people who arrived in the Valley of Mexico in the late 12th or early 13th centuries. The Tepanec were a sister culture of the Aztecs (or Mexica) as well as the Acolhua and others—these tribes spoke the Nahuatl language and shared the same general pantheon, with local and tribal variations.

The name "Tepanecas" is a derivative term, corresponding to their original mythical city, Tepanohuayan (the passing by), also known as Tepano. Ideographically it is represented as a stone, for its etymology comes from Tepan (over the stones). Their conquered territories received the name Tepanecapan (land of the tepanecas) (lit. "over the tepanecas").

Reputedly welcomed to the Valley of Mexico by the semi-legendary Chichimec ruler Xolotl, the Tepanecs settled on the west shores of Lake Texcoco.  Under their tlatoani, Acolnahuacatl, the Tepanec took over Azcapotzalco from the indigenous inhabitants. In the early 14th century, Tezozomoc brought the Tepanec to the height of their power; at that point they controlled nearly all of the Valley of Mexico as well as parts of the Toluca and Morelos valleys. Native sources say that Tezozomoc lived to the age of over 100 and was legendary for his generalship and statesmanship.

The death of Tezozomoc in 1426 brought his sons Tayatzin and Maxtla to the throne, with Maxtla most likely poisoning Tayatzin. In 1428, Maxtla was overthrown by the nascent Aztec Triple Alliance, which included the Mexicas of Tenochtitlan and the Acolhua of Texcoco, as well as Maxtla's fellow Tepanecs of Tlacopan. With the rise of the Aztec empire, Tlacopan became the predominant Tepanec city, although both Tenochtitlan and Texcoco eclipsed Tlacopan in size and prestige.

According to the tradition recompiled by several historians, the Tepanec people constituted one of the seven tribes that started the migration from Chicomoztoc (in nahuatl, "The Seven Caves"); a place which has no certain location, and while, during the middle of the 20th century, the general opinion was that La Quemada had to be the place, in the opinion of later investigators the city must've been north of the Valley of Mexico, or towards the ancient Tula, even in the Chiconauhtla hill, south of Teotihuacan). To the Tepaneca tribe belonged, by their military might, one of the best zones where they founded Azcapotzalco main Altepetl of their territory, known as Tepanecapan.

When the Spaniard conquistadores arrived to the Valley of Mexico, the Tepaneca tribe was subject to the Triple Alliance, led by Tenochtitlan, not able to remain as an ethnic group. We know of their existence thanks to references in stories derived from the prehispanic codex traditions, which were compiled by novohispanic historians.

Notes

Footnotes

References
 
 
 

Mesoamerican cultures
Nahua people
Indigenous peoples in Mexico
Valley of Mexico
15th-century disestablishments in Mexico
1428 disestablishments